Henry Mangles Denham Thomson (28 April 1872 – 29 August 1947) was an Australian politician.

He was born at "Cormiston", a farm in Launceston. In 1925 he was elected to the Tasmanian House of Assembly as a Nationalist member for Bass. He held the seat until his defeat in 1931. He died in Sydney.

References

1872 births
1947 deaths
Nationalist Party of Australia members of the Parliament of Tasmania
Members of the Tasmanian House of Assembly